The New Hague School is a Dutch architectural style dating from the period between the two World Wars. Related to Amsterdam School and Bauhaus architecture, the style is characterised by its straight lines and cubist shapes. The term was first used in 1920, by the Amsterdam School-architect C. J. Blaauw.

See also 
 New Hague School (visual arts)

Brick Expressionism
Dutch architectural styles
Expressionist architecture
20th-century architectural styles